Ahnejat (also known as Ahnehjad) is a village in Anarestan Rural District, Riz District, Jam County, Bushehr Province, Iran. At the 2006 census, its population was 25, in 6 families.

References 

Populated places in Jam County